The 1968 World Series was the championship series of Major League Baseball's (MLB) 1968 season. The 65th edition of the World Series, it was a best-of-seven playoff between American League (AL) champion Detroit Tigers and the National League (NL) champion (and defending World Series champion) St. Louis Cardinals. The Tigers won in seven games for their first championship since 1945, and the third in their history.

In his third appearance in the Series, Lolich had to pitch after only two days' rest in the deciding Game 7, because regular-season 31-game winner Denny McLain was moved up to Game 6 – also on two days' rest. In Game 5, the Tigers' hopes for the title would have been in jeopardy had Bill Freehan not tagged out Lou Brock in a home plate collision, on a perfect throw from left fielder Willie Horton, when Brock elected not to slide and went in standing up.

The 1968 season was tagged "The Year of the Pitcher", and the Series featured dominant performances from Cardinals pitcher Bob Gibson, MVP of the 1964 and 1967 World Series. Gibson came into the World Series with a regular-season earned run average (ERA) of just 1.12, a modern era record, and he pitched complete games in Games 1, 4, and 7. He was the winning pitcher in Games 1 and 4. In Game 1, he threw a shutout, striking out a Series record 17 batters, besting Sandy Koufax's 1963 record by two; it still stands as the World Series record today. In Game 4, a solo home run by Jim Northrup was the only offense the Tigers were able to muster, as Gibson struck out ten batters. In Game 7, Gibson was defeated by series MVP Lolich, allowing three runs on four straight hits in the seventh inning, although the key play was a Northrup triple that was seemingly misplayed by center fielder Curt Flood and could have been the third out with no runs scoring.

The World Series saw the Cardinals lose a Game 7 for the first time in their history. This was the sixth World Series of the 1960s to go to a full seven games, the most of any decade. The Tigers were the third team to come back from a three-games-to-one deficit to win a best-of-seven World Series, the first two being the 1925 Pirates and the 1958 Yankees; since then, the 1979 Pirates, the 1985 Royals, and the 2016 Cubs have also accomplished this feat.

Detroit manager Mayo Smith received some notoriety for moving outfielder Mickey Stanley to shortstop for the 1968 World Series, which has been called one of the gutsiest coaching moves in sports history by multiple sources. Stanley, who replaced the superior fielding but much weaker hitting Ray Oyler, would make two errors in the Series, neither of which led to a run.

This was also the final World Series played prior to MLB's 1969 expansion, which coincided with the introduction of divisional play and the League Championship Series. Thus, it was the final World Series that guaranteed the teams with the best records from each league would be playing.

All seven games of NBC's TV coverage were preserved on black-and-white kinescopes by the Canadian Broadcasting Corporation, and circulate among collectors. Games 1 and 5 have been commercially released; these broadcasts, and that of Game 7, were frequently shown on CSN (Classic Sports Network) and ESPN Classic in the 1990s and 2000s.

Summary

Matchups

Game 1

The Tigers roared into Game 1 by setting a then-team record with 103 victories on the season and were appearing in their first World Series in 23 years. The Tigers led the American League with 185 home runs. Their team batting average was .235, fourth best in the league; the team stole only 26 bases on the year. The Cardinals, on the other hand, stole 110 bases, led the NL with 48 triples, and had a team batting average of .249, but hit only 73 home runs. Pitching was about even as both teams set their rotations for Game 1 with solid starters and adequate relievers.

Fans overflowed Busch Stadium for Game 1 to watch the highly anticipated match-up of the Major League's top two pitchers—the Cardinals' Bob Gibson (22–9, 1.12 ERA) and the Tigers' Denny McLain (31–6, 1.96 ERA). Gibson was looking to become the first National League pitcher to win six World Series games while McLain was pitching in his first World Series game. The Cardinals had far more World Series experience than the Tigers with most of the Cardinal lineup (including all nine Game 1 starters) having played in a prior World Series. Both pitchers were highly competitive, fast workers, sporting overpowering fastballs coupled with excellent control.

Gibson's performance in Game 1 was phenomenal. The menacing right-handed pitcher shut out the Tigers on just five hits, and he struck out a World Series-record 17 Detroit Tigers batters.

The Cardinals broke through with three in the fourth off McLain. After McLain walked Roger Maris and Tim McCarver, Cardinal third baseman Mike Shannon singled in Maris and went to second base when Tiger left fielder Willie Horton misplayed the ball. McCarver pulled in at third. Cardinal second baseman Julián Javier followed this by singling in both baserunners to make the score 3–0. Outfielder Lou Brock added a home run in the seventh inning to complete the scoring.

Gibson finished the game in the ninth inning with his 15th, 16th, and 17th strikeouts to pass Sandy Koufax's previous record of 15, set in the 1963 World Series.

Game 2

The Tigers' starting pitcher Mickey Lolich earned a complete-game victory and the Tigers tied the Series.

Tiger outfielder Willie Horton hit a home run in the second inning; Lolich also helped his own cause with a homer in the third inning off the Cardinals' starter, Nelson Briles, scoring the eventual game-winning run. This was the only home run that Lolich hit during his entire professional career. The Tigers broke the game open in the sixth inning when first baseman Norm Cash led off with another homer, and second baseman Dick McAuliffe later provided a two-run single.

Cardinal first baseman Orlando Cepeda gave St. Louis a run with an RBI single in the sixth, but that was all they scored. Al Kaline scored in the seventh inning when Jim Northrup hit into a double play, and the Tigers scored their final two runs in the ninth inning with bases-loaded walks to Don Wert and Lolich.

Game 3

In the first of three games at Detroit's Tiger Stadium, Al Kaline started the scoring with a two-run homer in the third inning, but the Cardinals came back in the fifth inning on an RBI double by center fielder Curt Flood off starter Earl Wilson. After Wilson put another batter on base, catcher Tim McCarver launched a three-run home run for the eventual game-winning runs off relief pitcher Pat Dobson. The Tigers cut the deficit to just one run on a home run by Dick McAuliffe. But Orlando Cepeda put the game out of reach in the seventh inning by smacking a three-run home run.

The Cardinals' reliever Joe Hoerner entered the game in the sixth in relief of Ray Washburn (who got the win) and earned a save.  Hoerner also collected a single batting in the eighth and became the first major leaguer to get a hit in the World Series after going hitless for the entire season.

Game 4

Tiger manager Mayo Smith, needing another left-handed bat in the lineup, made a major change by inserting veteran Eddie Mathews at third base. Mathews, recovering from a spinal operation that nearly ended his career, had one hit in the last game of his major league career. After a 35-minute rain delay, hard-hitting Hall-of-Famer Hank Greenberg threw out the first pitch.

McLain had trouble warming up amidst the rainfall, and was throwing with less velocity from the outset. A 31-game winner during the regular season, he struggled for the second time in this World Series, as this one-sided pitching match-up with Bob Gibson showed. Lou Brock led the game off with a home run, and Mike Shannon added an RBI single later in the first inning.  Two more Cardinals runs were knocked in during the third inning on Tim McCarver's triple and Mike Shannon's double. McLain's troubles continued, and after a walk to Julián Javier, the umpires stopped the game due to rain with two out in the third inning. McLain did not return when play resumed after a one-hour and 15-minute rain delay. Bob Gibson did return after the delay, and helped his own cause by hitting a home run off Joe Sparma in the fourth inning. Next, Lou Brock knocked a triple and scored on a ground-out by Roger Maris.

The Cardinals' final runs came in the eighth inning when Gibson walked with the bases loaded, forcing in one run, and then Lou Brock drove in three more runs with a double.  Brock was just a single short of hitting for the cycle in this game.

The Tigers' only run came in the fourth inning when Jim Northrup hit a home run. Other than that, Gibson was a nearly perfect pitcher, tossing his second complete game in this World Series while striking out ten batters. The Cards now had a commanding 3–1 series lead.

Game 5

With the World Series on the line, the Tigers used their winner of Game 2, Mickey Lolich, as their starting pitcher. Lolich's first inning in this game was not too promising, as he allowed an RBI single by Curt Flood and a two-run home run to Orlando Cepeda. However, Lolich soon settled down, striking out eight Cardinal batters and allowing no more runs.

Tigers' first baseman Norm Cash began the team comeback with a sacrifice fly in the fourth inning, plating Mickey Stanley who had tripled. This was followed by a Willie Horton triple and Jim Northrup's RBI single, making it a 3–2 game. In the fifth inning, the Cardinals had a chance to go up by two runs after Lou Brock hit a one-out double. Cardinal second baseman Julián Javier followed with a base hit to left. Outfielder Willie Horton fielded the ball off the ground and then fired the ball towards home plate. Instead of sliding into home plate, Brock tried to bowl over Tiger catcher Bill Freehan. However, Freehan caught and held onto the ball while blocking the corner of the plate with his foot, and Brock was called out. This was the last time that the Cardinals threatened to score in the game.

The Cardinals' starting pitcher Nelson Briles was taken out of the game in the seventh inning with one runner on base, and was replaced by reliever Joe Hoerner. After Hoerner loaded the bases, the Tigers began a game-winning rally, with Al Kaline hitting a two-run single to give his team a 4–3 lead.  Norm Cash then knocked in an insurance run with a single.

Jose Feliciano's unconventional pre-game singing of "The Star-Spangled Banner" aroused considerable controversy, with the Tigers and NBC receiving thousands of angry letters and telephone calls about the performance. Lolich also blamed Feliciano's unusually long rendition for causing him to get cold after his warm-ups and thus give up three early runs.

Game 6

Now needing two wins in St. Louis to win the World Series, Tiger manager Mayo Smith chose Denny McLain again as his starting pitcher, even though he had only two days' rest and had not been very successful in his two prior Series starts. Cardinals' manager Red Schoendienst stayed with his normal three-starter rotation, selecting Ray Washburn, who had won Game 3. The choice of McLain paid off for the Tigers, as he pitched a complete game in a 13–1 rout of the Cardinals.

The Tigers went up 2–0 in the second inning on RBI hits by Willie Horton and Bill Freehan. In the third, the Tigers sent 15 batters to the plate and scored 10 runs off of three Cardinals pitchers. Jim Northrup's grand slam highlighted the inning. Al Kaline added a home run in the fifth inning. The Cardinals' lone run came off an RBI single by Julián Javier with two outs in the bottom of the ninth, but that was all they could do against McLain.

Game 7

In a fitting end to this Series (and the final game of Roger Maris' career) the two teams' hottest pitchers, Mickey Lolich and Bob Gibson, squared off in a classic duel, until an infamous hit over the head of Curt Flood. Like McLain in Game 6, Lolich was starting on only two days' rest.

Lolich and Gibson matched zeroes for six innings, but in the top of the seventh, Gibson surrendered two-out singles to Norm Cash and Willie Horton. Jim Northrup then hit a hard smash to deep center; Curt Flood, who won numerous Gold Glove awards in his career, misjudged it and briefly started in on the ball before turning around to go back. The ball one-hopped the warning track, two runs scored, Northrup wound up with a triple, and Lolich had all the runs he needed. Flood has been criticized by some who believe he would have caught the ball had his first steps been back instead of in.  Jim Northrup said, "[Flood] slipped a little, but the ball was 40 feet over his head. He never had a chance to catch it." However,  his teammate Denny McLain claimed in his 1975 book that "Flood blew it." Orlando Cepeda, in his 1998 autobiography Baby Bull, asserts that Flood would have caught the ball, had he not misjudged it. In the October 29, 1968, issue of The Sporting News, both Flood and manager Red Schoendienst indicated they would have expected the normally sure-handed outfielder to catch such a ball. By starting in, Flood had to both reverse direction and then regain his acceleration. He then slipped on the wet grass before recovering his speed, and by that time the ball was well beyond him. Bill Freehan then doubled in Northrup, and in the top of the ninth, Don Wert added an RBI single.

The Cardinals got a run in the ninth on a Mike Shannon homer, but that was all as Lolich pitched his third complete game.  The final out of the series was recorded when Bill Freehan caught a pop foul off the bat of Tim McCarver. Gibson struck out eight in the losing cause, giving him a record 35 strikeouts by one pitcher in a World Series, but Lolich was named World Series MVP. This is the last World Series game to date to feature complete games from both starting pitchers.

Cardinals shortstop Dal Maxvill went hitless in 22 World Series at-bats, a record.

Composite box
1968 World Series (4–3): Detroit Tigers (A.L.) over St. Louis Cardinals (N.L.)

Quotes

Notes

References

See also
1968 Japan Series

Further reading

External links

 Detroit Tigers History

World Series
World Series
Detroit Tigers postseason
St. Louis Cardinals postseason
World Series
World Series
1968 in Detroit
1960s in St. Louis
October 1968 sports events in the United States
Baseball competitions in Detroit
Baseball competitions in St. Louis